Daniel Horák (born 10 October 2000) is a Czech footballer who plays for Sparta Prague B as a left-back.

Club career

AC Sparta Prague
Horák made his professional debut for Sparta Prague against Viktoria Plzeň on 28 June 2020.

References

External links
 FK Pohronie official club profile 
 
 
 Futbalnet profile 

2000 births
Living people
Czech footballers
Association football defenders
AC Sparta Prague players
FC Vysočina Jihlava players
FK Pohronie players
Bohemian Football League players
Moravian-Silesian Football League players
Czech National Football League players
Czech First League players
Slovak Super Liga players
Expatriate footballers in Slovakia
Czech expatriate sportspeople in Slovakia